Robert P. Gonzalez (born March 18, 1963) is currently a scout for the Detroit Pistons of the National Basketball Association. Gonzalez was previously the head coach at Manhattan College and Seton Hall University. He is well known for leading the Jaspers to two NCAA tournaments and the second NCAA tournament win in school history.

Gonzalez had previously been an assistant under Pete Gillen at Xavier, Providence and Virginia, serving as one of Gillen's top recruiters.

Early life and education
A native of Binghamton, New York, Gonzalez graduated from Buffalo State College in 1986.

Coaching career

Early coaching career (1986–1999)
Gonzalez began his career as an assistant at Broome Community College in the 1986–87 season then moved up to the NCAA Division I level as an assistant at Binghamton in 1987–88. From 1988 to 1991, Gonzalez was an assistant at St. Nicholas of Tolentine High School in The Bronx and coached AAU teams as well. In the 1992–93 school year, Gonzalez was head coach at Rice High School in Manhattan.

Gonzalez later was an assistant under Pete Gillen for six seasons, first at Xavier in the 1993–94 season, then at Providence from 1994 to 1998, and finally at Virginia in the 1998–99 season.

Manhattan (1999–2006)
Gonzalez had a career record of 129–77 in seven seasons at Manhattan, including two trips to the NCAA tournament.  He took the 12th-seeded Jaspers to the second round of the 2004 NCAA tournament after the team defeated five seed Florida Gators in the first round; the program's second ever NCAA Tournament win.

Seton Hall (2006–2010)
Gonzalez was hired by Seton Hall in April 2006, largely because of his recruiting pedigree and his ties to high school coaches in New York City (which is 14 miles east of Seton Hall's campus).

Gonzalez's first season as Seton Hall coach ended with an under .500 record overall. The season ended with a 13–16 record and a record of 4–12 in the Big East. Seton Hall finished 13th out of 16 in the Big East and missed the Big East tournament for the first time ever.

Gonzalez's second season at Seton Hall was more successful than his first. The Pirates finished the regular season with 7 Big East wins and 17 wins overall. They qualified for the Big East tournament for the first time under Gonzalez as the 11 seed against the 6 seed Marquette Golden Eagles. Marquette won the game 67–54 to advance to the quarterfinals against the University of Notre Dame. The Pirates missed out on an NIT bid and rejected an invitation to the inaugural College Basketball Invitational.

The 2008–09 season saw the Pirates notch an identical record to the previous year—a 17–15 overall record and a 7–11 Big East record. As the 11th seed in the 2009 Big East men's basketball tournament, they defeated 14th-seed South Florida 68–54 for their first win in the conference tournament in six years. However, they lost the next day to Syracuse, 89–74. School officials rewarded with Gonzalez a contract extension that would have kept him at Seton Hall until 2015.

Gonzalez led the 2009–10 Pirates to postseason play for the first time in four years, with a berth in the NIT. Six minutes into the Pirates' first-round matchup with Texas Tech, forward Herb Pope knocked Texas Tech's Darko Cohadarevic to the floor with a punch to the groin. After officials reviewed the play on the replay monitor, Pope was ejected from the game, and Seton Hall subsequently lost 87–69.

The next day on March 17, 2010, Seton Hall fired Gonzalez. Despite the Pirates' on-court improvement, school officials did not believe that he was a good representative for Seton Hall. According to The Star-Ledger, Seton Hall University School of Law dean Patrick Hobbs, who oversaw the athletic department at the time, recommended Gonzalez's firing on the weekend before the NIT. In a statement released after Gonzalez' ouster, Hobbs said that Seton Hall had "core expectations" for how coaches and players conduct themselves. Seton Hall president Monsignor Robert Sheeran made the final decision to fire Gonzalez, saying that he no longer had confidence in Gonzalez' "ability to coach and to lead." He added that "athletics never exist to besmirch the university in any way." School officials were displeased with Gonzalez's behavior—specifically, his tendency to berate Seton Hall administrators, opposing coaches, opposing players and referees. They were also concerned about several incidents involving Seton Hall players.

A month after his firing, Gonzalez sued Seton Hall for wrongful termination, seeking to be paid for the last two years of his contract. The suit was settled in August 2010; terms were not disclosed.

After Seton Hall (2010–present)
Since leaving Seton Hall, Gonzalez has been a scout for NBA teams, motivational speaker, basketball analyst on TV and radio, and consultant.

Gonzalez was the assistant coach of BC Nevėžis of Lithuanian Basketball League for the 2020-21 season.

In 2021, Gonzalez joined the Detroit Pistons as a scout.

USA Basketball
Gonzalez was an assistant coach with the 2005  USA Basketball World University Games Team that won a gold medal in Turkey.  He was also a court coach for the 2002 USA Junior National Team Trials.

Head coaching record

References

1963 births
Living people
American men's basketball coaches
Basketball coaches from New York (state)
Basketball players from New York (state)
Binghamton Bearcats men's basketball coaches
Buffalo State Bengals men's basketball players
College men's basketball head coaches in the United States
High school basketball coaches in New York (state)
Junior college men's basketball coaches in the United States
Manhattan Jaspers basketball coaches
Providence Friars men's basketball coaches
Seton Hall Pirates men's basketball coaches
Sportspeople from Binghamton, New York
Virginia Cavaliers men's basketball coaches
Xavier Musketeers men's basketball coaches